ATN Jaya TV (still unofficially known as ATN Tamil) is a Canadian exempt Category B Tamil language specialty channel owned by Asian Television Network (ATN). It broadcasts programming from Jaya TV, a popular television channel from India, and Canadian content.

Programming includes dramas, sitcoms, talk shows, movies and more.  ATN Jaya TV was previously known on air as ATN Tamil Channel before a deal with Jaya TV was made and the name change occurred.

History
On November 24, 2000, ATN was granted approval from the Canadian Radio-television and Telecommunications Commission (CRTC) to launch a television channel called Tamil Channel, described as "The licensee shall provide a national ethnic Category 2 specialty television service targeting the Tamil-speaking community."

On August 30, 2013, the CRTC approved Asian Television Network's request to convert ATN Jaya TV from a licensed Category B specialty service to an exempted Cat. B third language service.

References

External links
 

Digital cable television networks in Canada
Tamil-language television in Canada